União Paulista is a municipality in the state of São Paulo in Brazil. The population is 1,865 (2020 est.) in an area of 78.9 km². The elevation is 480 m.

References

Municipalities in São Paulo (state)